Isabel Calvimontes (November 19, 1790 – December 20, 1855) was a Bolivian-born Argentine patriot who participated in Buenos Aires society at the service of the May Revolution and in the early years of the emancipatory movement. She is one of the Patricias Argentinas.

Early life and marriage
Isabel Calvimontes Trujillo was born on November 19, 1790, in Chuquisaca, Upper Peru. She was the daughter of José Calvimontes, prosecutor of the court of the Real Audiencia of Charcas and Florencia Trujillo.

On August 14, 1804, in Chuquisaca, she married Dr. Pedro José Agrelo, who had befriended her father at the University of Saint Francis Xavier. She had several children, among them José Pedro Agrelo Calvimontes and the future colonel, Martín Avelino Agrelo Calvimontes.

The failure of the Chuquisaca Revolution in 1809 forced Pedro José Agrelo to abandon his post as subdelegate in Tupiza and move with his wife to his hometown, the City of Buenos Aires. There, he did not take long to integrate into the circles that promoted American independence and when the May Revolution of 1810 took place, the couple immediately joined the patriot movement.

1811–12
In June 1811, Diego Saavedra, son of Cornelio Saavedra, the president of the Junta Grande, and Juan Pedro Aguirre left for the United States as commissioners with the mission of acquiring weapons and ammunition in that country.

At the beginning of 1812, the commissioners concluded a contract for the purchase of 1,000 rifles and 350,000 bullets with the firm Miller & Wambor. On May 13, the commissioners and supplies arrived at the Barragán cove port aboard the US-flagged vessel Liberty and on May 19, they anchored off the port of Buenos Aires. Word spread of the ship's arrival at the port of Buenos Aires and that the economic situation of the revolutionary government made its purchase difficult.

On May 30, 1812, fourteen society women of Buenos Aires met at the home of Tomasa de la Quintana, the wife of Antonio José de Escalada. The patrician women, who would become known as the "Sociedad Patriótica" (Patriotic Society) made donations equivalent to thirteen rifles and two ounces of gold so that, according to Bernardo de Monteagudo, they could say, "I armed this brave man who assured our freedom". The patricians requested that each of the rifles acquired with their contributions would bear the name of the donor. In addition to Calvimontes, the women who subscribed by donating a rifle were, Tomasa de la Quintana, María de los Remedios de Escalada, María de las Nieves de Escalada, María de la Quintana, María Eugenia de Escalada de Demaría, Ramona Esquivel y Aldao, Mariquita Sánchez, Petrona Bernardina Cordero, Rufina de Orma, María de la Encarnación Andonaégui de Valdepares, Magdalena de Castro de Herrero y Ángela Castelli de Irgazábal, while the two ounces of gold was donated by Carmen de la Quintanilla de Alvear. On June 26, the First Triumvirate accepted the patrician donation, rendering "the most expressive thanks in the name of the country", in the Gazeta de Buenos-Ayres.

Exile and death
Her husband's political life led him into exile in the United States (1817), imprisonment on the Martín García Island, and again in exile in Montevideo, where he was killed on July 23, 1846. Sometimes, Calvimontes accompanied her husband, while at other times, they were separated. While in exile, she sometimes lived in a high social position, and in other times, in misery. She took care of the family and faced setbacks with resignation.

Calvimontes died in Buenos Aires on December 20, 1855.

See also
 Argentine War of Independence

Notes

References

Bibliography
 Carranza, Adolfo Pedro (1910). Patricias Argentinas. Buenos Aires: Sociedad Patricias Argentinas. (in Spanish)
 Cutolo, Vicente Osvaldo (1968). Nuevo diccionario biográfico argentino (1750-1930). Buenos Aires: Editorial Elche. (in Spanish)
 Sosa de Newton, Lily (1972). Diccionario biográfico de mujeres argentinas. Buenos Aires. (in Spanish)
 Yaben, Jacinto R. (1952). Biografías argentinas y sudamericanas. Buenos Aires: Ediciones Históricas Argentinas. (in Spanish)

1790 births
1855 deaths
People from Chuquisaca Department
Argentine philanthropists
Patricias Argentinas